Near the Trail's End is a 1931 American Western film directed by Wallace Fox and written by George Arthur Durlam. The film stars Bob Steele, Marion Shockley, Jay Morley, Si Jenks, Hooper Atchley and Murdock MacQuarrie. The film was released on September 30, 1931, by Tiffany Pictures.

Cast           
Bob Steele as Marshal Johnny Day
Marion Shockley as Jane Rankin
Jay Morley as Red Thompson
Si Jenks as Texas
Hooper Atchley as Bart Morgan
Murdock MacQuarrie as Dan Cather
Henry Roquemore as Mayor 'Cash' Watkins

References

External links
 

1931 films
American Western (genre) films
1931 Western (genre) films
Tiffany Pictures films
Films directed by Wallace Fox
American black-and-white films
1930s English-language films
1930s American films